Benito Calderón (1902 – death unknown) was a Cuban catcher in the Negro leagues in the 1920s. 

A native of Cienfuegos, Cuba, Calderón made his Negro leagues debut in 1926 with the Cuban Stars (West). He played for the Stars again the following season, then finished his career in 1928 with the Homestead Grays.

References

External links
 and Baseball-Reference Black Baseball stats and Seamheads

1902 births
Date of birth missing
Place of death missing
Year of death missing
Cuban Stars (West) players
Homestead Grays players
Cuban baseball players
Baseball catchers
People from Cienfuegos